Jason Riley may refer to:

 Jason L. Riley (born 1971), American journalist and author
 Jason Riley (Canadian football) (born 1958), Canadian football offensive lineman